Job A. Edson (February 14, 1854 – July 30, 1928) was twice the president of Kansas City Southern Railway.

References
 Kansas City Southern Historical Society, The Kansas City Southern Lines. Retrieved August 15, 2005.

1854 births
1928 deaths
20th-century American railroad executives
Kansas City Southern Railway

19th-century American businesspeople